Malmi station is a railway station in the Malmi district of Helsinki, Finland.

Malmi station was opened in 1871 to serve a nearby army training ground and received new station buildings in 1873 and 1878. The third station building was constructed 1932–1934, and was electrified in 1969. The current station building was completed in 1986, and Helsinki commuter rail services began to call at this station in 1988. Malmi station was also the starting point of the Malmi Cemetery Railway (fi:Malmin hautausmaan rautatie) branch line, which served funeral trains heading towards Malmi Cemetery from 1895 until 1954.

Gallery

References

External links 
 

Railway stations in Helsinki